Indulekha may refer to:

Indulekha (novel), an 1889 Malayalam novel by O. Chandu Menon
Indulekha (1999 film), a 1999 Malayalam film
Indulekha.com, an infotainment web portal for Malayalam entertainment
Indulekha (2020 TV series) , A 2020 Malayalam TV Series